The Irish League in season 1911–12 comprised 8 teams, and Glentoran won the championship.

League standings

Results

References
Northern Ireland - List of final tables (RSSSF)

1911-12
1911–12 in European association football leagues
Irish